Félix Porteiro Pérez (born 26 August 1983 in Castellón) is a Spanish racing driver. He competed in GP2 in 2006, his best finish was 6th.

Racing career

Single-seaters 
In 2001 Porteiro drove in the Spanish Formula Three Championship, finishing fourth in the standings, with one win. In 2002 he began racing in the World Series by Nissan. He finished 18th in the standings in 2002, 14th in 2003 and seventh in 2004. He finished fifth in 2005, when the series became Formula Renault 3.5.

In 2006 he raced in the GP2 Series with Campos Racing, finishing 22nd in the standings.

Touring cars 

Porteiro made his touring car debut near the end of 2006, driving a BMW 320si for ROAL Motorsport at the European Touring Car Cup, finishing fifth. He impressed the team enough to earn a full-time drive in their World Touring Car Championship team, BMW Team Italy-Spain, in 2007. He scored his first ever win at Brno, and finished twelfth in the final standings. In 2008, he got his second win at Oschersleben, ending the year tenth overall.

For 2009 he was replaced by fellow Spaniard Sergio Hernández. Porteiro switched teams with him, moving to the independent Proteam Motorsport. He finished second in the Independent's Trophy.

Porteiro was left without a drive for the 2010 season, as Hernández returned to Proteam after ROAL's departure from the WTCC.

Racing record

Career summary

Complete Formula Renault 3.5 Series results 
(key) (Races in bold indicate pole position) (Races in italics indicate fastest lap)

Complete GP2 Series results 
(key) (Races in bold indicate pole position) (Races in italics indicate fastest lap)

Complete World Touring Car Championship results
(key) (Races in bold indicate pole position) (Races in italics indicate fastest lap)

References

External links 

 

1983 births
Living people
Sportspeople from Castellón de la Plana
Spanish racing drivers
GP2 Series drivers
Euroformula Open Championship drivers
World Touring Car Championship drivers
World Series Formula V8 3.5 drivers
European Touring Car Cup drivers
Epsilon Euskadi drivers
Campos Racing drivers
KTR drivers
BMW M drivers
Sports car racing team owners